Yarn is a long continuous length of interlocked fibres, used in sewing, crocheting, knitting, weaving, embroidery, ropemaking, and the production of textiles. Thread is a type of yarn intended for sewing by hand or machine. Modern manufactured sewing threads may be finished with wax or other lubricants to withstand the stresses involved in sewing. Embroidery threads are yarns specifically designed for needlework. Yarn can be made of a number of natural or synthetic materials, and comes in a variety of colors and thicknesses (referred to as "weights"). Although yarn may be dyed different colours, most yarns are solid coloured with a uniform hue.

Etymology 
The word yarn comes from Middle English, from the Old English , akin to Old High German , "yarn", Dutch , Italian , "string", and Sanskrit , "band".

History 
The human production of yarn is known to have existed since the Stone Age and earlier prehistory, with ancient fiber materials developing from animal hides, to reeds, to early fabrics. Cotton, wool, and silk were the first materials for yarn, and textile trade contributed immensely to the ancient global economy.

Materials 
Yarn can be made from a number of natural or synthetic fibers, or a blend of natural and synthetic fibers.

Natural fibers

Cotton  

The most common plant fiber is cotton, which is typically spun into fine yarn for mechanical weaving or knitting into cloth.

Silk
Silk is a natural protein fiber, some forms of which can be woven into textiles. The protein fiber of silk is composed mainly of fibroin and is produced by the larvae of the moth Bombyx mori. Silk production is thought to have begun in China and silk thread and cloth manufacture was well-established by the Shang dynasty (1600–1050 BCE).

Linen
Linen is another natural fiber with a long history of use for yarn and textiles. The linen fibers are derived from the flax plant.

Other plant fibers

Other plant fibers which can be spun include bamboo, hemp, maize, nettle, and soy fiber.

Animal fibers
The most commonly spun animal fiber is wool harvested from sheep. Shearing sheep helps the sheep regulate their body temperature and avoid pests.

Other animal fibers used include alpaca, angora, mohair, llama, cashmere, and silk. More rarely, yarn may be spun from camel, yak, possum, musk ox, vicuña, cat, dog, wolf, rabbit, bison, or chinchilla hair, as well as turkey or ostrich feathers. Natural fibers such as these have the advantage of being slightly elastic and very breathable while trapping a great deal of air, making for some of the warmest fabrics.

Synthetic fibers

Some examples of synthetic fibers that are used as yarn are nylon, acrylic fiber, rayon, and polyester. Synthetic fibers are generally extruded in continuous strands of gel-state materials. These strands are drawn (stretched), annealed (hardened), and cured to obtain properties desirable for later processing.

Synthetic fibers come in three basic forms: staple, tow, and filament. Staple is cut fibers, generally sold in lengths up to 120 mm. Tow is a continuous "rope" of fibers consisting of many filaments loosely joined side-to-side. Filament is a continuous strand consisting of anything from one filament to many. Synthetic fiber is most often measured in a weight per linear measurement basis, along with cut length. Denier and Dtex are the most common weight to length measures. Cut-length only applies to staple fiber.

Filament extrusion is sometimes referred to as "spinning" but most people equate spinning with spun yarn production.

Yarn from recycled materials
T-shirt yarn is a yarn made from the same fabric as is used in T-shirts and other wearables. It is often made from the remainder fabric of clothing manufacture, and therefore is considered a recycled and green product. It can also be made at home out of used clothing. The resulting yarn can be used in knitted or crocheted items.

Comparison of material properties 

In general, natural fibers tend to require more careful handling than synthetics because they can shrink, felt, stain, shed, fade, stretch, wrinkle, or be eaten by moths more readily, unless special treatments such as mercerization or superwashing are performed to strengthen, fix color, or otherwise enhance the fiber's own properties.

Some types of protein yarns (i.e., hair, silk, feathers) may feel irritating to some people, causing sensations of contact dermatitis, hives, wheezing reactions. These reactions are likely a sensitivity to thicker and coarser fiber diameter or fiber ends. In fact, contrary to popular belief, wool allergies are practically unknown. According to a study reviewing the evidence of wool as an allergen conducted by Acta Dermato-Venereologica, contemporary superfine or ultrafine Merino wool with their reduced fibre diameters do not provoke itch, are well tolerated and in fact benefit eczema management. Further studies suggest that known allergens applied during textile processing are minimally present in wool garments today given current industry practices and are unlikely to lead to allergic reactions.

When natural hair-type fibers are burned, they tend to singe and have a smell of burnt hair; this is because many, as human hair, are protein-derived. Cotton and viscose (rayon) yarns burn as a wick. Synthetic yarns generally tend to melt though some synthetics are inherently flame-retardant. Noting how an unidentified fiber strand burns and smells can assist in determining if it is natural or synthetic, and what the fiber content is.

Both synthetic and natural yarns can pill. Pilling is a function of fiber content, spinning method, twist, contiguous staple length, and fabric construction. Single ply yarns or using fibers like merino wool are known to pill more due to the fact that in the former, the single ply is not tight enough to securely retain all the fibers under abrasion, and the merino wool's short staple length allows the ends of the fibers to pop out of the twist more easily.

Yarns combining synthetic and natural fibers inherit the properties of each parent, according to the proportional composition. Synthetics are added to lower cost, increase durability, add unusual color or visual effects, provide machine washability and stain resistance, reduce heat retention or lighten garment weight.

Structure

Spun yarn
Spun yarn is made by twisting staple fibres together to make a cohesive thread, or "single". Twisting fibres into yarn in the process called spinning can be dated back to the Upper Paleolithic, and yarn spinning was one of the first processes to be industrialized. Spun yarns are produced by placing a series of individual fibres or filaments together to form a continuous assembly of overlapping fibres, usually bound together by twist. Spun yarns may contain a single type of fibre, or be a blend of various types. Combining synthetic fibres (which can have high strength, lustre, and fire retardant qualities) with natural fibres (which have good water absorbency and skin comforting qualities) is very common. The most widely used blends are cotton-polyester and wool-acrylic fibre blends. Blends of different natural fibres are common too, especially with more expensive fibres such as alpaca, angora and cashmere.

Yarn is selected for different textiles based on the characteristics of the yarn fibres, such as warmth (wool), light weight (cotton or rayon), durability (nylon is added to sock yarn, for example), or softness (cashmere, alpaca).

Yarn is composed of twisted strands of fiber, which are known as plies when grouped together. These strands of yarn are twisted together (plied) in the opposite direction to make a thicker yarn. Depending on the direction of this final twist, the yarn will have either s-twist (the threads appear to go "up" to the left) or z-twist (to the right). For a single ply yarn, the direction of the final twist is the same as its original twist. The twist direction of yarn can affect the final properties of the fabric, and combined use of the two twist directions can nullify skewing in knitted fabric.

The mechanical integrity of yarn is derived from frictional contacts between its composing fibers. The science behind this was first studied by Galileo.

Carded and combed yarn 
Combed yarns are produced by adding another step of yarn spinning, namely combing, which aligns the fibres and removes the short fibres carried over from the previous step of carding. Combed yarn results in superior-quality fabrics. In comparison to carded yarns, this particular yarn is slightly more expensive, because the weaving is a long, consuming process. Combining separates small fibres from elongated fibres, in which this procedure makes the yarn softer and smoother.

Hosiery yarn 
Hosiery yarns are used in the manufacturing of knitted fabrics. Since the knitted materials are more delicate than woven materials; hence hosiery yarns are made 'softer' with fewer twists per inch than their woven counterparts. Hosiery yarn comes from a separate spinning process, and is used with circular knitting machines to form fabric.

Open-end yarn 
Open-end yarn is produced by open-end spinning without a spindle. The method of spinning is different from ring spinning. In open-end yarn, there is no roving frame stage. Sliver from the card goes into the rotor, is spun into yarn directly. Open-end yarn can be produced from shorter fibers. Open-end yarns are different from ring yarns. Open-end yarns are limited to coarser counts.

Novelty yarn 

Novelty yarns or complex yarns are yarns with special (fancy) effects introduced during spinning or plying. One example is slub yarns, yarn with thick or thin sections alternating regularly or irregularly. In a similar manner, creating deliberate unevenness, additions or injections of neps or metallic or synthetic fibers (along with natural fibers) in spinning creates novelty yarns.

Filament yarn

Filament yarn consists of filament fibres (very long continuous fibres) either twisted together or only grouped together. Thicker monofilaments are typically used for industrial purposes rather than fabric production or decoration. Silk is a natural filament, and synthetic filament yarns are used to produce silk-like effects.

Texturized yarn

Texturized yarns are made by a process of air texturizing filament yarns (sometimes referred to as taslanizing), which combines multiple filament yarns into a yarn with some of the characteristics of spun yarns. They are synthetic continuous filaments that are modified to impart special texture and appearance. It was originally applied to synthetic fibers to reduce transparency, slipperiness and increase warmth, absorbency and makes the yarn more opaque. It was used to manufacture a variety of textile products: knitted underwear and outer wear, shape-retaining knitted suits, overcoats. They also were used in the production of artificial fur, carpets, blankets, etc.

Colour 

Yarn may be used undyed, or may be coloured with natural or artificial dyes. Most yarns have a single uniform hue, but there is also a wide selection of variegated yarns:

 Heathered or tweed: yarn with flecks of different coloured fibre
 Ombre: variegated yarn with light and dark shades of a single hue
 Multicolored: variegated yarn with two or more distinct hues (a "parrot colourway" might have green, yellow and red)
 Self-striping: yarn dyed with lengths of colour that will automatically create stripes in a knitted or crocheted object
 Marled: yarn made from strands of different-coloured yarn twisted together, sometimes in closely related hues

Weight 
Yarn quantities for handcrafts are usually measured and sold by weight in ounces (oz) or grams (g). Common sizes include 25g, 50g, and 100g skeins. Some companies also primarily measure in ounces with common sizes being three-ounce, four-ounce, six-ounce, and eight-ounce skeins. Textile measurements are taken at a standard temperature and humidity, because fibers can absorb moisture from the air. The actual length of the yarn contained in a ball or skein can vary due to the inherent heaviness of the fibre and the thickness of the strand; for instance, a 50 g skein of lace weight mohair may contain several hundred metres, while a 50 g skein of bulky wool may contain only 60 metres.

There are several thicknesses of craft yarn, referred to as weight. This is not to be confused with the measurement and weight listed above. The Craft Yarn Council of America is making an effort to promote a standardized industry system for measuring this, numbering the weights from 0 (finest) to 7 (thickest). Each weight can be described by a number and name. Size 0 yarn is called Lace, size 1 is Super Fine, size 2 is Fine, size 3 is Light, size 4 is Medium, size 5 is Bulky, size 6 is Super Bulky, and size 7 is Jumbo.

Each weight also has several common, unregulated terms associated with it. However, this naming convention is more descriptive than precise; fibre artists disagree about where on the continuum each lies, and the precise relationships between the sizes. These terms include: fingering, sport, double-knit (or DK), worsted, aran (or heavy worsted), bulky, super-bulky, and roving.

Another measurement of yarn weight, often used by weavers, is wraps per inch (WPI). The yarn is wrapped snugly around a ruler and the number of wraps that fit in an inch are counted.

Labels on yarn for handicrafts often include information on gauge, which can also help determine yarn weight. Gauge, known in the UK as tension, is a measurement of how many stitches and rows are produced per inch or per cm on a specified size of knitting needle or crochet hook. The proposed standardization uses a four-by-four inch/ten-by-ten cm knitted stockinette or single crocheted square, with the resultant number of stitches across and rows high made by the suggested tools on the label to determine the gauge.

In Europe, textile engineers often use the unit tex, which is the weight in grams of a kilometre of yarn, or decitex, which is a finer measurement corresponding to the weight in grams of 10 km of yarn. Many other units have been used over time by different industries.

Yarn skeins 
There are many different ways in which yarn is wound, including hanks, skeins, donut balls, cakes, and cones.

Hank 
A hank of yarn is a looped bundle of yarn, similar to how wire is typically sold. The yarn is usually tied in two places directly opposite each other to keep the loops together and to keep them from tangling. Hanks are a preferred method of fastening yarn for many yarn sellers and yarn-dyers due to its ability to more widely display the qualities of the fiber. It is often wound using a swift, a standing contraption that holds a yarn hank without obstruction and spins on a central axis to facilitate yarn ball winding There are two subtypes of hanks: twisted and folded. A twisted hank is a hank that has been twisted into a rope braid. A folded hank is a hank that has been folded in half and wrapped in a label for retail purposes.

Skein 
Skeins are one of the most common types of yarn ball. Although skeins are technically described as yarn that has been wound into an oblong shape, the word "skein" is used generically to describe any ball of yarn. Many large-scale yarn retailers like Lion brand and parent companies like Yarnspirations sell their yarn in skeins. Unlike other types of yarn balls, a skein allows you to access both ends of the yarn. The yarn end in the inside of the skein is called a center pull. One major complaint of center pull bullet skeins is that the inside yarn end is not easily found, and often is pulled out of the skein in a jumble of tangled yarn called "yarn barf". There are two types of skeins: a pull skein, which is more rectangular in shape, and a bullet skein, which is rounder.

Microscopic aspect of selected yarns 
Below are the images taken by a digital USB microscope. These show how the yarn looks in different kinds of clothes when magnified.

See also 

 Crochet thread
 Dye lot
 Electrically conducting yarn
 Embroidery thread
 Microfiber
 ISO 2
 List of novelty yarns
 List of yarns for crochet and knitting
 Thread (yarn)
 Textile manufacturing
 Yarn bombing
Yarn conditioning

References

External links 

 

 
Knitting tools and materials
Crochet
Sewing
Weaving
Fibers
Animal hair products
Recycling by material